John Surla (born April 20, 1988 in Niagara Falls, Ontario) is a professional Canadian football linebacker in the Canadian Football League who is currently a free agent. He played CIS football for the Western Ontario Mustangs.

He was originally signed by the Winnipeg Blue Bombers on May 18, 2011 after going undrafted in the 2011 CFL Draft. After failing to make the team, he signed with the Alouettes. On May 7, 2012, he was released by the Alouettes.

References 

1988 births
Living people
Canadian football linebackers
Montreal Alouettes players
Players of Canadian football from Ontario
Sportspeople from Niagara Falls, Ontario
Western Mustangs football players
Winnipeg Blue Bombers players